The Hermosillo Gallos Blancos was a soccer team that played in the Primera Division 'A' between the 1995 to 1996. They played in Hermosillo, Sonora, Mexico.

History
The origin of the club goes back to the 1994-95 season, when Querétaro was reborn after Tampico-Madero had problems with their stadium and changed its name to Tampico Madero Gallos Blancos to play the remaining 9 games of the season. At the end of the season the team would drop to Primera Division 'A', and this would lead to the origin of the club Hermosillo.

Entrepreneurs turned their gaze to new destinations with footballing future, so they decide to move the team of Querétaro to Hermosillo, a city located in northwest Mexico where, at the time, football was virtually an unknown sport. The challenge was to attract fans in a baseball-dominated region. The old team Tampico Madero Gallos Blancos would be called Gallos Blancos de Hermosillo, with Alejandro Dominguez as coach and owners at the time were the Alverde brothers.

They would play only one season in the city but achieved several successes including reaching the final of the 1995-96 season against Pachuca, which lose promotion to Primera Division Mexicana. The two meetings would be in favor of Pachuca with a score of 2-1, with an aggregate of 4-2.

Stadium
The Gallos Blancos played their matches at the biggest stage of the capital city of the state of Sonora, the Estadio Héroe de Nacozari. The stadium holds 22,000 seats and has also hosted other football teams like Coyotes de Sonora and Búhos de Hermosillo.

Honours
Runner-up Primera Division 'A' (1): 1995-96

References

Ascenso MX teams
Association football clubs established in 1995
Association football clubs disestablished in 1996
1995 establishments in Mexico
1996 disestablishments in North America
Defunct football clubs in Mexico
Football clubs in Sonora
Sport in Hermosillo